Rosamaria Montibeller (born 9 April 1994) is a Brazilian volleyball player. She usually plays as an opposite Spiker and occasionally as a wing spiker. She won the silver medal while making her debut appearance at the Olympics representing Brazil at the 2020 Summer Olympics.

She was part of the Brazil women's national volleyball team that won silver at the 2015 Pan American Games in Toronto, Ontario, Canada.

Early life
She comes from a family of Italian origins.

Career
She began playing the sport of volleyball at the age of nine during a local youth project.

Club career 
She began her career in 2011, making her debut for São Caetano in the Superliga Série A. She played for São Caetano until 2013. Then she played for Campinas Voleibol Clube from 2013 to 2014. She represented Minas Tênis Clube from 2015 to 2018 for a period of three years and won the 2018 Women's South American Volleyball Club Championship with Minas Tenis Clube. The club also subsequently qualified to participate at the 2018 FIVB Volleyball Women's Club World Championship after winning the 2018 South American Championship.

She later switched to Praia Clube at the end of the 2018 season and eventually won the Brazilian Super Cup with the club in 2019. She was also part of the Dentil Praia Clube which emerged as runners-up to Minas Tênis Clube at the 2018/19 Brazilian Women's Volleyball Superliga and was also a key member of the Dentil Praia Clube which emerged as runners-up in the 2019 Women's South American Volleyball Club Championship.

International career 
She was part of the Brazilian side that emerged as champions of the 2012 Women's Junior South American Volleyball Championship after defeating hosts Peru in the final. She participated at the 2013 FIVB Volleyball Women's U20 World Championship where Brazil finished at seventh position. She captained Brazil's U23 team, which won the 2015 FIVB Volleyball Women's U23 World Championship. It was also Brazil's first title in the FIVB Volleyball Women's U23 World Championship. She also competed at the 2017 FIVB Volleyball World Grand Prix where Brazil defeated Italy in the final to be crowned as winners. She was also named in the Brazilian squad for the 2018 FIVB Volleyball Women's Nations League where Brazil finished at fourth place.

She was a member of the national which finished in seventh position at the 2018 FIVB Volleyball Women's World Championship. She also took an indefinite two-year break from international volleyball from 2019 to 2021 and returned to the national team for the 2021 FIVB Volleyball Women's Nations League where Brazil emerged as runners-up to United States in the final.

She was also selected to the national squad to compete in the women's volleyball tournament at the 2020 Summer Olympics. She won the silver medal at the 2020 Summer Olympics after Brazil lost 21–25, 20–25, 14–25 to United States in the gold medal match of the women's volleyball tournament.

Awards

Individuals

 2012 U20 South American Championship – "Best Opposite Spiker"
 2015 FIVB U23 World Championship – "Best Opposite Spiker"
 2018 South American Club Championship – "Best Outside Spiker"

Clubs
 2018 South American Club Championship –  Champion, with Minas Tênis Clube
 2019 South American Club Championship –  Runner-up, with Dentil Praia Clube
 2018–19 Brazilian Superliga –  Runner-up, with Dentil Praia Clube

References

External links
 FIVB Biography
  at toronto2015.org

Living people
Brazilian women's volleyball players
Place of birth missing (living people)
1994 births
Volleyball players at the 2015 Pan American Games
Pan American Games medalists in volleyball
Pan American Games silver medalists for Brazil
Opposite hitters
Outside hitters
Medalists at the 2015 Pan American Games
Volleyball players at the 2020 Summer Olympics
Olympic volleyball players of Brazil
Medalists at the 2020 Summer Olympics
Olympic medalists in volleyball
Olympic silver medalists for Brazil
Brazilian people of Italian descent